Cudoniella clavus is a species of fungus in the family Helotiaceae. It was first described in 1805 by Johannes Baptista von Albertini and Lewis David de Schweinitz as Peziza clavus. British mycologist R. W. G. Dennis transferred it to Cudoniella in 1964. They are usually cream in colour, sometimes with hints of ochre or violet. They grow on rotting twigs, stems, leaves, and cones that are submerged in water. Cudoniella clavus is a widespread and common species. It is inedible.

References

External links

Fungi described in 1805
Fungi of North America
Helotiaceae
Inedible fungi
Taxa named by Lewis David de Schweinitz
Taxa named by Johannes Baptista von Albertini